Aaron Chen (born 1995) is a Chinese-Australian comedian from Sydney.

Early life
Aaron Chen was born in 1995.

He went to North Sydney Boys High, where he started doing stand-up.

Career
In 2012, aged 15, Chen won Melbourne International Comedy Festival's "Class Clowns", a national competition for high-school children, and after this started performing in pubs around Sydney.

In 2014 Chen appeared at the Melbourne Comedy Festival in its "Comedy Zone" section.

In 2017, Chen's performed his debut solo show The Infinite Faces Of Chenny Baby, appearing at the Melbourne and Sydney Comedy Festivals and touring nationally, earning good reviews and selling out his shows and earning Best Newcomer awards at both. In the same year, he unintentionally caused controversy in the Australian soccer world by appearing as an unconventional interviewer at a football game, a friendly between English Premier League club Liverpool F.C. and Sydney F.C.. In the same year, Aaron Chen Tonight, filmed live in Café Lounge, Surry Hills, Sydney, was broadcast on ABC Television.

From 2021, Chen has played assistant and receptionist George in Kitty Flanagan's sitcom about a law firm,  Fisk. The same year, he appeared on the panel show Patriot Brains.

In 2022, Chen performed his show If It Weren't Filmed, Nobody Would Believe at the Melbourne and Sydney Comedy Festivals, with a video of the show released on YouTube in September 2022.

Chen has performed at Splendour in the Grass music festival, and supported Ronny Chieng on his Australian tour as well as featuring in his ABC TV show, Ronny Chieng International Student. He has also performed on a number of panel shows on TV.

Recognition and awards
2012: Winner, "Class Clowns" competition at  Melbourne International Comedy Festival
2013: NSW representative at the National Grand Final, Raw Comedy
2016: Director's Choice Award
2017: Winner, Best Newcomer, Melbourne International Comedy Festival
2017: Winner, Best Newcomer, Sydney Comedy Festival
2021: Nominated, AACTA Award for Best Short Form Comedy, for his 2020 video A Life in Questions: Wisdom  School with Aaron Chen, on Adult Swim in the U.S (with Henry Stone and Joshua Duncan)
2021: Nominated, best show,  Melbourne International Comedy Festival

Personal life
Chen proposed to his future wife Esther Shim in May 2022 at McDonald's, announcing the engagement on Instagram afterwards.

References

External links

1995 births
Living people
Australian stand-up comedians
People from Sydney
Australian male comedians
Australian people of Chinese descent